This is a list of nicknames for the traditional counties of Ireland and their inhabitants. The nicknames are mainly used with reference to the county's representative team in gaelic games organised by the Gaelic Athletic Association (GAA). A few of the names are quite old and well-known; most are recent coinages mainly used by journalists. Some refer specifically to the Gaelic games county colours.

Many counties have multiple nicknames – for example, Kildare may be called "the short grass county" or "the thoroughbred county" – while some counties have separate nicknames for the county and people: for example Wexford is often called the Model county, and Wexford people are called "yellowbellies". A few nicknames are shared: any Connacht county playing a team from elsewhere may be dubbed "the Westerners"; London GAA or New York GAA may be called "the Exiles"; Westmeath, Fermanagh, and Cavan have each been called "the Lake county".

List

Other inter-county GAA teams

Outside Ireland, the GAA is organised into regional bodies which have the same status as Irish counties, some of which compete in the same inter-county competitions.

In 2008, the main Dublin and Down hurling teams were supplemented with second teams competing in the Nicky Rackard Cup, respectively called Fingal and South Down.

See also
 Lists of nicknames – nickname list articles on Wikipedia

Footnotes

Sources

References

Nicknames
Nicknames
County nicknames
Irish county
Irish county
Irish county
County